Anthoula "Anthi" Mylonaki (born 10 June 1984) is a female Greek water polo player and Olympic silver medalist. She is part of the Greece women's national water polo team.

Career
Mylonaki received a silver medal at the 2004 Summer Olympics in 2004 Athens.

She participated at the 2008 Women's Water Polo Olympic Qualifier in Imperia, where Greece finished 4th and qualified for the 2008 Olympics in Beijing as one of the eight qualified countries.

See also
 Greece women's Olympic water polo team records and statistics
 List of Olympic medalists in water polo (women)
 List of women's Olympic water polo tournament goalkeepers

References

External links

1984 births
Living people
Greek female water polo players
Water polo goalkeepers
Olympic water polo players of Greece
Water polo players at the 2004 Summer Olympics
Olympic silver medalists for Greece
Olympic medalists in water polo
Medalists at the 2004 Summer Olympics
Olympiacos Women's Water Polo Team players
Water polo players from Chania
21st-century Greek women